Humble Beast is the debut studio album by American rapper G Herbo. It was released on September 22, 2017, by Machine Entertainment Group, 150 Dream Team, Cinematic Music Group and RED Distribution, serving as his first commercial release with Cinematic and RED. The album features production from Da Internz, Southside, C-Sick and DJ Ron, among others. It features guest appearances from American rappers Lil Uzi Vert, Bump J, Lil Bibby, Lil Yachty and Jeremih, among others.

Background
The album was announced in late September 2015. The cover art was later revealed on June 15, 2017. The release date was finally revealed on August 25, 2017. The pre-order was released on September 1, 2017.

Promotion
On September 15, 2017, the EP S4MF2 (abbreviation for Strictly 4 My Fans 2) was released as a prelude to the album.

A deluxe version of the album was announced and originally set to be released on February 9, 2018, however it was delayed. On February 10, 2018, a new release date was unveiled. The revision will include the addition of the tracks "Shook" and "Everything (Remix)" featuring Lil Uzi Vert and Chance the Rapper, which were previously released, along with 8 other songs. It was released on February 16, 2018.

Singles
The lead single, "Red Snow", was released on March 9, 2017. The second single, "I Like", was released on August 11, 2017. The third and final single "Everything" featuring Lil Uzi Vert, was released on August 25, 2017. "4 Minutes of Hell, Pt. 5" was released as a pre-order single on September 1, 2017.

Promotional singles
On January 23, 2018, "Shook" was released as the lead promotional single. Two days later, its music video was released.

On February 14, 2018, G Herbo teased a remix of "Everything" featuring an additional guest appearance from Chance the Rapper. It was released a day later as the second promotional single.

Critical reception

Scott Glaysher of HipHopDX stated that "Chicago's drill rappers haven't had much in the way of a musical shelf life over the past few years. What was once the hottest subgenre now sounds like outdated craze, which is perhaps why Lil Herb went for a strategic rebrand just over a year ago. But it wasn't just his name that matured, his craftwork and lyrical diversity also graduated from the "Lil" league", praising the album's lyricism: "It's clear Herbo still wears his street soldier armor. But more than ever before, he lets his guard down and shows a new level of self-awareness." Patrick Lyons of HotNewHipHop stated that "G Herbo's shown promise throughout his career, and "Humble Beast" feels like a culmination of sorts", praising the album's lyricism: "Herbo is speaking directly to us, sounding as confident and classic as his childhood idols Jay-Z and Nas, telling a story that he's known is important and necessary all along." David Drake of Pitchfork stated that "The Chicago rapper has earned his role as a leader of rap. His latest album recalls the best records of the ’00s graced with a singular kind of songwriting that sounds inarguably like the present", praising the album's lyricism: "Humble Beast feels musically bifurcated between its street and soul segments; a street-soul production synthesis could give his sound some cohesion, and giving his reflective moments a contemporary canvas could only increase their urgency." Preezy of XXL stated that "Humble Beast is an exemplary debut that ranks among the best of the year, exceeds expectations and puts G Herbo in position to claim his stake as the prince of Chi-Town street rap."

Commercial performance
Humble Beast debuted at number 21 on the US Billboard 200 chart, earning 20,000 album-equivalent units (including 14,000 copies as pure album sales) in its first week. The album also debuted at number 14 on the US Top R&B/Hip-Hop Albums chart.

Track listing
Credits adapted from the album's liner notes and BMI.

Notes
  signifies a co-producer
  signifies an additional producer
  signifies an uncredited co-producer or co-writer

Sample credits
 "Mirror" contains an uncredited sample from "Mirror of My Soul", written by Renee Kirk and Edward Randle, as performed by O.V. Wright.

Personnel
Credits adapted from the album's liner notes.

Technical
 Matt Hennessy – recording , mixing 
 Salvador Majail – recording 
 Daniel Watson – recording 
 Kesha Lee – recording 
 Jim Caruana – recording 
 Brian Cabanatuan – recording 
 Jeff Lane – recording 
 Thomas "Tillie" Mann – recording 
 Miguel Scott – mixing , recording 
 James "Groove" Chambers – mixing 
 Dave Kutch – mastering 

Additional personnel
 Arturo "Churro" Lopez – album artwork, booklet design and additional photos

Charts

References

G Herbo albums
2017 debut albums
Cinematic Music Group albums
RED Distribution albums
Albums produced by C-Sick
Albums produced by Da Internz
Albums produced by Jake One
Albums produced by London on da Track
Albums produced by Southside (record producer)
Albums produced by TM88
Albums produced by Don Cannon
Albums produced by Young Chop